Beatrice "Bea" Afflerbach-Hefti (June 14, 1920 – March 3, 2003) was a Swiss graphic designer. Afflerbach-Hefti was born in Basel, Switzerland, and died in Binnigen.

Life and work 
Beatrice Afflerbach-Hefti studied at the Kunstgewerbeschule Basel (today Schule für Gestaltung Basel) and was the first woman to graduate with a diploma in graphic design in 1941. After her studies she founded an office together with Sita Jucker and her later husband Ferdinand "Ferdi" Afflerbach in 1942, where commercially successful graphics were created.

Afflerbach-Hefti was involved in the women's rights movement. In 1957, she was one of the founding members of the Soroptimist International Club Basel, a club of working women that supports charitable projects worldwide. She designed posters with women's voting rights and took part in the Schweizerischen Ausstellung für Frauenarbeit (Swiss exhibition for women's work) in 1958.

The estate of the couple lies in the archives of the Schule für Gestaltung Basel.

Worksamples 
 Maria Aebersold: Reserfiert für Basler. Illustrationen von Beatrice Afflerbach. Pharos, Basel 1961, DNB 363268375.
 Hanni Salfinger: Das Flügelkleid. Bettinger Märchenbuch. Illustrationen von Beatrice Afflerbach. Schudel, Riehen 1972, .
 Elisabeth Klein: Die Entstehung der Welt und der Gestirne. Indianische und andere Sagen. Mit einem mehrfarbigen Poster von Beatrice Afflerbach. Novalis, Schaffhausen 1976, .
 Miggeli Aebersold: S’ Honorar und anderi baseldytschi Gschichte. Illustrationen von Beatrice Afflerbach. Pharos, Basel 1977, .

Literature 
 Eberhard Hölscher: Ferdi und Beatrice Afflerbach. In: Gebrauchsgraphik. Jahrgang 25, Heft 2, 1954, S. 26–33 (online).
 Julia Meer: Afflerbach, Beatrice. Kurzbiografie. In: Gerda Breuer, Julia Meer (Hrsg.): Women in Graphic Design 1890–2012. Jovis, Berlin 2012, S. 395.

External links 
 Miriam Baumeister: Beatrice Afflerbach-Hefti im Personenlexikon des Kantons Basel-Landschaft
 Beatrice Afflerbach. In: Sikart (Stand: 2018)

References 

1920 births
2003 deaths
Swiss graphic designers
Artists from Basel-Stadt
Swiss feminists